Cesar Palacio is a Canadian politician. He was the Toronto city councillor for Ward 17 Davenport during the years 2003-2018. He was the first Hispanic person to be elected to Toronto's City Council.

Biography
Born in Ecuador he followed his father to Toronto in 1972.  Working several blue-collar jobs he first became involved in politics as a volunteer with local MP Charles Caccia. In 1985 he was hired the executive assistant to Councillor Betty Disero and he remained in the office for several years.  For a few months in 2000 he was appointed to fill the seat vacated by Dennis Fotinos, but the appointment was conditional on him not running in the subsequent election.  In the 2003 Toronto election he ran to succeed Disero and won. He also won subsequent re-election in the 2006 Toronto election. He is fluent in Italian, English, Spanish and Portuguese. He is a cousin of the former President of Ecuador, Alfredo Palacio.

In the 2010 Toronto election, Palacio won re-election over six other candidates: Brian Bragason, Tony Letra, Maria Marques, Kar Rasaiah, Jonah Schein, and Ben Stirpe. He was one of five Councillors removed from the TTC board by council in March 2012 as a result of voting to terminate the services of the TTC General Manager Gary Webster.

Palacio ran again in the 2014 Toronto election defeating a strong challenger Alejandra Bravo. On June 11, 2015 Palacio supported the Hybrid option for the Gardiner Expressway

Changes to the City of Toronto ward boundaries imposed by the Ontario Provincial Government of Doug Ford resulted in the disappearance of former Ward 17 Davenport in the 2018 municipal election.  Palacio initially announced he would run for re-election in the new larger Ward 9 Davenport in the 2018 Toronto election but ultimately withdrew his candidacy.

Election results

References

External links

Toronto city councillors
Ecuadorian emigrants to Canada
Living people
Year of birth missing (living people)